The (near) open front rounded vowel, or (near) low front rounded vowel, is a type of vowel sound that has not been confirmed to be phonemic in any spoken language. , the lowercase version of the ligature, is used for the open-mid front rounded vowel.

A phoneme generally transcribed by this symbol is reported from the Bavarian dialect of Amstetten. However, it is phonetically open-mid, .

It occurs allophonically in Weert Limburgish as well as in some speakers of Danish and Swedish. Certain transcriptions of Danish use  to denote an open-mid front rounded vowel .

Features

Occurrence

See also
 Index of phonetics articles

Notes

References

External links
 

Open vowels
Front vowels
Rounded vowels